The 2019 Overwatch League All-Star Game was the second Overwatch League (OWL) All-Star Game that matched the top players in the Atlantic Division (ATL) against those in the Pacific Division (PAC). The game was played on May 16, 2019 at Blizzard Arena in Burbank, California and was the culmination of the league's 2019 All-Star Weekend.

All-Star Game

Roster selection 
The rosters and coaches for the All-Star Game were selected through a voting process. In order to be eligible for selection, a player must have played at least 10 regular season games or participated in the 2018 All Star Game. The starters were chosen by the fans, with voting beginning on March 16 and ending on April 28. Fans were allowed to vote for a maximum of two DPS, two tank, and two support players from each division. After the starting rosters were announced, an additional 12 players from each division were selected as reserves by Overwatch League players, coaches, casters, and staffers. The starting roster was revealed in early May, with the full roster being revealed in mid-May.

Game summary

All-Star Weekend

Talent Takedown 
The Atlantic and Pacific coaches were to draft teams consisting of three casters and analysts and three all-stars, and square off in a 6v6 best-of-three series that included lockout elimination, escort and control. The format was changed, however, to only allow casters and analysts to play.

Widowmaker 1v1 
The Widowmaker 1v1 included the top four Widowmaker players, selected and seeded by the All-Star team coaches, from both divisions against one another in a single-elimination bracket. Eliminations were head-shot only, and automatic firing was be disabled. The quarterfinals and semifinal were inter-division, and the finals were an Atlantic vs. Pacific championship match. The maps were Castillo for the quarterfinals, Necropolis for the semifinals, and Ecopoint: Antarctica for the finals.

All-Star Arcade 
The All-Star Arcade had fans vote for which game mode they would like to see during the All-Star Weekend. Voting took place on April 26; the events that the fans voted for were:
 Sibling Rivalry – 6v6. Three Genjis and three Hanzos per team. Assault (Hanamura).
 Healers Never Die – 6v6. Supports only. One hero limit. Control (Nepal).
 Terrible, Terrible Damage – 6v6. Damage only. One hero limit. Hybrid (Hollywood).
 Keeping the Peace – 6v6. McCree only. Escort (Route 66).
 Thanks, but No Tanks – 6v6. No tanks. One hero limit. Hybrid (Blizzard World).
The event was sponsored by State Farm.

Broadcasting
The entire All-Star Weekend was televised nationally by ESPN2 and live-streamed on Twitch and Overwatch League website.

References 

All-Star
Overwatch League